The Chamundeshwari Temple is a Hindu temple located on the top of Chamundi Hills about 13 km from the palace city of Mysuru in the state of Karnataka in India. The temple was named after Chamundeshwari or, the fierce form of Shakti, a tutelary deity held in reverence for centuries by the Maharaja of Mysuru.

Chamundeshwari is called by the people of Karnataka as Naada Devi (ನಾಡ ದೇವಿ), which means state Goddess. It is situated at the elevation of around 3300 ft from the mean sea level.

It is believed that Goddess Durga slayed the demon king Mahishasura on the top of this hill which was ruled by him. The place was later known as Mahishooru (Place of Mahisha). The British changed it to Mysore and later Kannadized into Mysuru.

Krouncha Peetha

The Chamundeshwari Temple is considered as a Shakti Peetha and one among the 18 Shakti Peethas. It is known as Krouncha Pitha as the region was known in Puranic times as Krouncha Puri.
It is said that the hair of Sati fell here.

Description
The original shrine is thought to have been built in the 12th century by the Rulers of the Hoysala Dynasty while its tower was probably built by the Rulers of the Vijayanagara Empire in the 17th century. In 1659, a staircase of one thousand steps was built leading up to the 3000-foot summit of the hill.
At the temple are several images of Nandi (the bull mount of Shiva). There is a huge granite Nandi on the 700th step on the hill in front of a small Shiva temple a short distance away. Believed to be sculpted in the 2nd century CE, this Nandi is over 15 feet high and 24 feet long with exquisite bells around its neck.

The temple is famous for the celebrations of festivals like Ashada Shukravara (ಆಶಾಡಾ ಶುಕ್ರವಾರ), Navaratri and Ammanavara Vardhanthi (ಅಮ್ಮನವರ ವರ್ಧಂತಿ). In the month of Ashadha, Fridays are considered particularly auspicious. Lakhs of devotees throng the temple during this occasion. Another festival celebrated during this month is Chamundi Jayanti. This day is celebrated on the anniversary of the consecration of the Utsava Moorti of the goddess by the Maharaja of Mysore. On this occasion, the goddess's idol is taken around the temple in a golden palanquin.

The most important festival that is celebrated here is Navaratri. Mysuru Dasara is celebrated as the state festival of Karnataka, called Nada habba (ನಾಡಾ ಹಬ್ಬಾ) in Kannada. During Navaratri, the idol is decorated in 9 different ways to depict the nine different aspects of the goddess known as Navadurgas. On the 7th day of Navaratri that is dedicated to the goddess Kalaratri, valuable jewels donated by Maharajas are brought from the District Treasury of Mysuru and are given to the temple to decorate the idol.

Another temple is situated at the foothill which is in Utthanahalli called as Jwalamalini Sri Tripura Sundari Temple. This goddess is considered the sister of Chamundeshwari who helped her at the battlefield to slay the demon Raktabīja.

See also
 Marikamba Temple, Sirsi
 Mookambika Temple, Kollur
 Annapurneshwari Temple, Cherukunnu
 Yellamma Temple, Saundatti

References

External links

 
 Sree Chamundeeswari of Mysore 
 Mysore Temple dedicated to Sri Chamundeswari 
 Mysore Nature | Chamundi Hill Reserve Forest
 Chamundi hill map
 Chamundeshwari tewmple complete info
 Official website

Buildings and structures in Mysore
Hindu temples in Mysore district
Tourist attractions in Mysore
Devi temples in Karnataka